Arne Selmosson (29 March 1931 – 19 February 2002) was a Swedish footballer who played as a striker.

Club career
Born in Götene, Selmosson played for Jönköpings Södra, Udinese, Lazio, Roma and Skövde AIK.

International career
Selmosson earned four caps for the Swedish national team between 1951 and 1958, scoring one goal, and played at the 1958 FIFA World Cup on home soil, in which the Swedish team finished as runners-up.

References

1931 births
2002 deaths
Swedish footballers
Sweden international footballers
Jönköpings Södra IF players
Udinese Calcio players
S.S. Lazio players
A.S. Roma players
Skövde AIK players
Allsvenskan players
Serie A players
Serie B players
Association football forwards
Swedish expatriate footballers
Swedish expatriate sportspeople in Italy
Expatriate footballers in Italy
1958 FIFA World Cup players
Götene IF players